Krazana is a 1928 Georgian black-and-white silent film directed by Kote Marjanishvili. It is based on the 1897 novel The Gadfly by Ethel Lilian Voynich.

"Krazana" means wasp in Georgian language.

Cast
 Nato Vachnadze as Jema
 Iliko Merabishvili as Arthur
 Aleksandre Imedashvili as Cardinal Montanelli
 Eliazar Imereli as Martin
 Victor Chankvetadze as Revolutionary

External links 
 

1928 films
1928 adventure films
Soviet black-and-white films
Soviet silent feature films
Soviet war films
Soviet-era films from Georgia (country)
Georgian-language films
Georgian words and phrases
Adventure films from Georgia (country)
Black-and-white films from Georgia (country)
Silent adventure films